Wanda Klaff (6 March 1922 – 4 July 1946) was a Nazi concentration camp overseer. Klaff was born in Danzig to German parents as Wanda Kalacinski. She was executed for war crimes.

Early life 
Wanda Kalacinski was the daughter of railway worker Ludwig Kalacinski. The family name was changed to Kalden in 1941. She finished school in 1938 and worked in a jam factory until 1942. That year, she married Willy Klaff and became a housewife, then a streetcar operator.

SS career, arrest, trial and execution 

In 1944, Klaff joined the Stutthof concentration camp staff at Stutthof's Praust subcamp in present-day Pruszcz, where she abused many of the prisoners. On 5 October 1944, she arrived at Stutthof's Russoschin subcamp, in present-day northern Poland.

Klaff fled the camp in early 1945 but on 11 June 1945 was arrested by Polish officials; soon after, she fell ill from typhoid fever in prison. She stood trial at the first Stutthof trial with other former female supervisors and male personnel. It is said that she stated at the trial, "I am very intelligent and very devoted to my work in the camps. I struck at least two prisoners every day."

Klaff was convicted and received the death sentence. She was publicly hanged by short-drop method on 4 July 1946 on Biskupia Górka Hill near Gdańsk, aged 24.

References

Sources 
 Benjamin B. Ferencz, Less Than Slaves: Jewish Forced Labor and the Quest for Compensation, books.google.com; accessed 13 November 2014.

1922 births
1946 deaths
Executed German women
Stutthof trials executions
People from the Free City of Danzig
Naturalized citizens of Germany
Executed people from Pomeranian Voivodeship
Female guards in Nazi concentration camps
Filmed executions
German people of Polish descent
Publicly executed people

People executed for crimes against humanity